Anastasia Semyonovna Davydova (born 2 February 1983) is a Russian former synchronised swimmer and five-time Olympic gold medalist, and current coach.

Biography
Davydova won gold medals in the duet competition with Anastasiya Yermakova at the 2004 Summer Olympics in Athens, 2008 Summer Olympics in Beijing, and was part of the Russian gold medal team in the 2004, 2008 and 2012 Olympics. After the London Olympics, Anastasia announced that she would retire from competition and take up coaching.

References

External links

1983 births
Living people
Olympic gold medalists for Russia
Russian synchronized swimmers
Olympic synchronized swimmers of Russia
Synchronized swimmers at the 2004 Summer Olympics
Synchronized swimmers at the 2008 Summer Olympics
Synchronized swimming coaches
Swimmers from Moscow
Olympic medalists in synchronized swimming
Synchronized swimmers at the 2012 Summer Olympics
Medalists at the 2012 Summer Olympics
Medalists at the 2008 Summer Olympics
Medalists at the 2004 Summer Olympics
World Aquatics Championships medalists in synchronised swimming
Synchronized swimmers at the 2011 World Aquatics Championships
Synchronized swimmers at the 2009 World Aquatics Championships
Synchronized swimmers at the 2007 World Aquatics Championships
Synchronized swimmers at the 2005 World Aquatics Championships
Synchronized swimmers at the 2003 World Aquatics Championships
Synchronized swimmers at the 2001 World Aquatics Championships